The 1953 Colombian coup d'état was the coup followed by seizing of power, by Colombia's commander in chief Gustavo Rojas Pinilla on June 13, 1953. He ruled as dictator until 1957.

References 
 (Colombia Coup 1953) 

1950s coups d'état and coup attempts
1953 in Colombia
Military coups in Colombia
June 1953 events in South America
Conflicts in 1953